Glen Baxter is the name of:

 Glen Baxter (artist) (born 1944), British cartoonist
 Glen Baxter (journalist), Canadian journalist
 Glen E. Baxter (1930–1983), American mathematician